Porto Real do Colégio is a municipality located in the Brazilian state of Alagoas.

Former indigenous languages
The unclassified extinct Wakoná language was formerly spoken in Penedo. Loukotka (1968) reported that the remaining ethnic descendants who speak only Portuguese could be found in the city of Porto Real do Colégio. The Xocó language and Natú language, both language isolates, were also spoken near present-day Porto Real do Colégio.

References

Municipalities in Alagoas